is a Japanese comedy manga series written and illustrated by Rieko Saibara, based on her experiences as a housewife and mother. It was serialized on a weekly basis in the  newspaper's morning edition from October 2002 to 26 June 2017. The manga was later collected into 14  volumes. It won several awards, including the Excellence Award at the 8th Japan Media Arts Festival in 2004, the Short Story Award at the Tezuka Osamu Cultural Prizes in 2005, and the President of the House of Councilors Award at the 40th Japan Cartoonist Awards in 2011.  was adapted into an anime television series directed by Mitsuru Hongo that aired on TV Tokyo from 1 April 2009 to 25 March 2012. Spanning 142 episodes, the anime was licensed in English under the title : Mom's Life on Crunchyroll's video streaming website.  was also adapted into a live-action film directed by Shōtarō Kobayashi, released in theaters in Japan on 5 February 2011. The film starred the real-life divorced couple Kyōko Koizumi and Masatoshi Nagase as the titular  and her husband. It won the Best Film for Asian New Talent Award at the 14th Shanghai International Film Festival in 2011. Additionally, Koizumi won the Best Actress Award at the 66th Mainichi Film Awards in 2012 and Nagase won the Best Actor Award at the 20th Japanese Movie Critics Awards.

References

Further reading
 Several pages of  translated into English at The Japan Times (defunct; link via the Wayback Machine)

External links
 Official manga website 
 Official anime website  (defunct; link via the Wayback Machine)
 Official film website  (defunct; link via the Wayback Machine)
 
 
 

2002 manga
2009 anime television series debuts
2012 Japanese television series endings
Anime series based on manga
Comedy anime and manga
Gallop (studio)
Japanese children's animated comedy television series
Live-action films based on manga
Manga adapted into films
Slice of life anime and manga
TV Tokyo original programming
Yumeta Company
2010s Japanese films